Marek Zieńczuk (born 24 September 1978 in Gdańsk) is a Polish former footballer who played as a midfielder.

Club career
Zieńczuk began his career at hometown club Lechia Gdańsk. Subsequently he joined Polonia Gdańsk, but quickly returned to Lechia where he made his senior debut.  In 2000, he moved to Amica Wronki. Before 2004–05 season he joined Wisła Kraków. He won the Ekstraklasa championship three times with Wisła Kraków. Zieńczuk was elected the best Ekstraklasa player in the 2007–08 season by "Sport" magazine. Also, he was named to the Ekstraklasa Best XI in the 2007–08 season by other players in Polish Footballers' Association voting.

In the summer 2009, he joined Greek club Skoda Xanthi. After one season, he returned to his home country and joined Lechia Gdańsk. After a half season spell, he moved to Ruch Chorzów on one and a half year contract.

International career
Zieńczuk played nine times for the Poland national football team.

Honours

Amica Wronki
 Polish Cup: 1999-00

Wisła Kraków
 Ekstraklasa: 2004–05, 2007–08, 2008–09

Individual
 Polish Domestic Best Player: 2007
 Ekstraklasa Best Player by "Sport": 2007–08
 Ekstraklasa Best XI: 2007–08

Statistics
 (correct as of 17 May 2014)

|}

References

External links
  

Living people
1978 births
Sportspeople from Gdańsk
Polish footballers
Poland international footballers
Polish expatriate footballers
Lechia Gdańsk players
Amica Wronki players
Wisła Kraków players
Xanthi F.C. players
Ruch Chorzów players
Ekstraklasa players
Expatriate footballers in Greece
Super League Greece players
Association football midfielders